The Hess test or Rumpel-Leede test is a medical test used to assess capillary fragility. It is also called the Tourniquet test.
 
To perform the test, pressure is applied to the forearm with a blood pressure cuff inflated to between systolic and diastolic blood pressure for 10 minutes. After removing the cuff, the number of petechiae in a 5 cm diameter circle of the area under pressure is counted. Normally less than 15 petechiae are seen. 15 or more petechiae indicate capillary fragility, which occurs due to poor platelet function, bleeding diathesis or thrombocytopenia, and can be seen in cases of scurvy, and Dengue fever.

The test is named after Alfred Fabian Hess.

References

External links 

Physical examination